La Santa is a village in Tinajo, Las Palmas province of western Lanzarote in the Canary Islands. The village has a small harbor and is a popular spot for water sports.

References

Populated places in Lanzarote